Kelly Tyler-Lewis is a filmmaker and author.  Kelly is best known for winning a 2002 Emmy for her historical documentary film, Shackleton’s Voyage of Endurance, which won as 'Best Historical Documentary'.  The film had also been nominated for 'Best Documentary'. She also wrote and published the 2006 book The Lost Men: The Harrowing Story of Shackleton's Ross Sea Party.

External links 
 Author Bio at Simon & Schuster

Living people
American screenwriters
Year of birth missing (living people)